This page describes the qualification procedure for FIBA Women's EuroBasket 2021. 14 teams joined the co-hosts France and Spain.

Qualifying draw
The draw for the qualification took place on 22 July 2019 in Munich, Germany.

 Teams marked in bold have qualified for EuroBasket Women 2021.

Groups
The top team from each one of the nine groups, as well as the five best-finishing second-placed teams, qualified.

Due to the COVID-19 pandemic, each group played the November 2020 games at a single venue. The same was done for the February 2021 games.

All times are local.

Group A

Group B

Group C

Group D

Group E

Group F

Group G

Group H

Group I

Ranking of second-placed teams
The five best second-placed teams from the groups qualify for the final tournament. Matches against the fourth-placed team in each group are not included in this ranking.

Qualified teams

Notes

References

External links
Official website

EuroBasket Women qualification
EuroBasket Women 2021
2019–20 in European women's basketball
2020–21 in European women's basketball